Pilot Premnath is a 1978 Tamil-language film written and directed by A. C. Tirulokchandar. The film stars Sivaji Ganesan as the eponymous character. It is based on R. Venkat's play Mezhugu Bommaigal. The film, the first joint Indo-Sri Lankan co-production in history, was shot entirely in Sri Lanka, while post-production took place in India. It was released on 30 October 1978.

Plot 

Premnath, a pilot, loses his wife in an accident and he decides to shower all his love and affection on his two sons and a blind daughter. But things change when he reads an unsent letter written by his wife.

Cast 
 Sivaji Ganesan as Premnath
 Malini Fonseka as Premnath's wife
 Vijayakumar as Premnath's son
 Jai Ganesh as Premnath's son
 Jayachitra as Vijayakumar's lover
 Sridevi as Kanchan
 Major Sundarrajan as Balu
 Prem Anand as Kanchan's lover
 Thengai Srinivasan as Premnath's co-pilot
 Manorama as Thengai Srinivasan's wife
 Sathyapriya as Jai Ganesh's lover

Production 
Pilot Premnath was directed by A. C. Tirulokchandar, who also wrote the screenplay while Aaroor Dass wrote the dialogues. The film was produced by D. M. Chandrasena,  Mukundan Menon and M. M. Saleem. The first joint Indo-Sri Lankan co-production in history, it was shot entirely in Sri Lanka, while post-production took place in Madras, India. The film was an adaptation of the play Mezhugu Bommaigal written by R. Venkat. Sivaji Ganesan portrayed the lead character originally played by A. R. Srinivasan, and Sridevi portrayed that character's blind daughter, reprising the role originally played by Sachu.

Soundtrack 
The songs were composed by  M. S. Viswanathan, and written by Vaali. The song "Azhagi Oruthi" belongs to Baila, a Sri Lankan genre.

Release and reception 
Pilot Premnath was released on 30 October 1978, Diwali day. The Hindu wrote, "Excellent photography is the chief asset of Pilot Premnath". The Indian Express wrote, "Captivating photography and M. S. Viswanathan's music. A few of the melodious numbers are bound to become hits". Kousigan of Kalki appreciated the film for its music and cinematography, especially the capturing of Sri Lankan locales on camera. Historian Randor Guy noted that the film was a "reasonable success" in both the countries it was produced.

References

External links 
 

1970s Tamil-language films
1978 films
Films directed by A. C. Tirulokchandar
Films scored by M. S. Viswanathan
Films shot in Sri Lanka
Indian films based on plays
Sri Lankan films based on plays